Nicolás Cicileo (born 1 October 1993) is an Argentine field hockey player who plays as a defender for Belgian Hockey League club Herakles and the Argentine national team.

Club career
Cicileo played for Ciudad de Buenos Aires in Argentina until 2015 when he moved to Europe to play for Club de Campo in Spain. During the 2015–16 Spanish winter break he played for Terengganu in the Malaysia Hockey League. He played three seasons for Club de Campo. After those three seasons he moved to the Netherlands to play for Klein Zwitserland. In April 2020, it was announced he would join Daring in Belgium for the 2020–21 season. After two seasons in Brussels he left Daring for Herakles.

International career
He represented Argentina at the 2018 Men's Hockey World Cup. In July 2019, he was selected in the Argentina squad for the 2019 Pan American Games. They won the gold medal by defeating Canada 5-2 in the final.

References

External links

1993 births
Living people
Field hockey players from Buenos Aires
Argentine male field hockey players
Male field hockey defenders
2018 Men's Hockey World Cup players
Field hockey players at the 2019 Pan American Games
Pan American Games gold medalists for Argentina
Pan American Games medalists in field hockey
Argentine expatriate sportspeople in Malaysia
Argentine expatriate sportspeople in the Netherlands
Argentine expatriate sportspeople in Spain
Argentine expatriate sportspeople in Belgium
Expatriate field hockey players
Club de Campo Villa de Madrid players
HC Klein Zwitserland players
Men's Hoofdklasse Hockey players
División de Honor de Hockey Hierba players
Men's Belgian Hockey League players
Medalists at the 2019 Pan American Games
Field hockey players at the 2020 Summer Olympics
Olympic field hockey players of Argentina
Royal Daring players
2023 Men's FIH Hockey World Cup players